The treasurer of the U.S. state of Ohio is responsible for collecting and safeguarding taxes and fees, as well as managing state investments. The Treasury was located in the Ohio Statehouse from 1861 to 1974, when it was moved to the Rhodes State Office Tower. The original office in the statehouse, which has been restored to its 19th-century appearance, is used for ceremonial events.

Before Ohio became a state, John Armstrong was Treasurer-General of the Northwest Territory from 1796 to 1803. He was appointed to the post by the United States Congress. Under the first constitution of Ohio, 1803 to 1851, the state legislature appointed a treasurer. Since the second constitution in 1852, the office has been elective.

The current officeholder is Republican Robert Sprague.

List of Ohio State Treasurers

Elections

Ohio voters  elect the treasurer for a four-year term in midterm election years, along with the governor and lieutenant governor, secretary of state, attorney general, and state auditor.

Notes

References

External sources

1803 establishments in Ohio